Julien or Julian Mitchell may refer to:

Julian Mitchell (director) (1852–1926), American theatre director and choreographer
Julien Mitchell (1888–1954), English film actor, a/k/a Julian Mitchell 
Julian Mitchell (playwright) (born 1935), English playwright, screenwriter and novelist